Picozoa, Picobiliphyta, Picobiliphytes, or Biliphytes are protists of a phylum of marine unicellular heterotrophic eukaryotes with a size of less than about 3 micrometers. They were formerly treated as eukaryotic algae and the smallest member of photosynthetic picoplankton before it was discovered they do not perform photosynthesis. The first species identified therein is Picomonas judraskeda. They probably belong in the Archaeplastida as sister of the Rhodophyta.

They were formerly placed within the cryptomonads-haptophytes assemblage.

Discovery 
At the end of the 1990s the European project "Picodiv" clarified which organisms occur in picoplankton. In addition, for a period of two years, samples were taken in the Atlantic, in the Mediterranean, before the coast of Scotland, Alaska and Norway. Picobiliphyta were found particularly within the nutrient-poor ranges from cold coastal seas, where they can constitute up to 50 percent of the biomass.

Affinities to other organisms 
Picozoa were first detected using 18S ribosomal RNA genes in 2007. The identity of new organisms was deduced from a comparison of familiar and unfamiliar gene sequences. “The gene sequences found in these algae could not be associated with any previously known group of organisms”, explain Klaus Valentin and Linda Medlin, co-authors of the study and molecular biologists at the Alfred Wegener Institute for Polar and Marine Research in Bremerhaven. The algae in this study were found in plankton samples originating from various regions of the North Atlantic and the Mediterranean. The scientists have discovered a group of organisms which, despite being completely new to science, have a wide distribution. “This is a good indication for how much there is still to discover in the oceans, especially using molecular tools”, says Valentin.

Apart from the unfamiliar gene sequences, the researchers also detected phycobiliproteins. In red algae, for example, these proteins occur as pigments. But in this newly discovered group of algae, the phycobiliproteins appear to be contained inside the plastids, where the photosynthesis occurs. Hence, it provides a clear indication that the researchers are dealing with previously unidentified group of algae. Referring to their small size and the presence of phycobiliproteins, the researchers named the new group "Picobiliphyta".

Two studies published in 2011 found the hypothesis that biliphytes, or picobiliphytes, were photosynthetic was likely to be false. A 2011 study by an international team from the Monterey Bay Aquarium Research Institute, Dalhousie University and the Natural History Museum London found that cells in the Pacific Ocean did not have fluorescence indicative of photosynthetic pigments, and concluded "...biliphytes are likely not obligate photoautotrophs but rather facultative mixotrophs or phagotrophs, whereby transient detection of orange fluorescence could represent ingested prey items (e.g., the cyanobacterium Synechococcus)". A study later in 2011, conducted by researchers at Rutgers University and Bigelow Laboratory for Ocean Sciences, used whole genome shotgun sequence data from three individual picobiliphyte cells to show absence of plastid-targeted or photosystem proteins within the fragments of nuclear genome sequence they reconstructed.  This again suggested that picobiliphytes are heterotrophs.

Most recently, Seenivasan working in conjunction with Michael Melkonian (University of Cologne) and Linda Medlin (Marine Biological Association of the UK) formally described the picobiliphytes as the heterotrophic nanoflagellate phylum, Picozoa, and published thin sections of the cells. Several unique features in the cell, such as a feeding organelle, substantiate their unique phylogenetic position, an unusual movement, and heterotrophic mode of nutrition.  No traces of viral or bacterial particles were found inside these heterotrophic cells, which prompted these authors to suggest that they feed on very small organic particles.

See also 

 Microphyte
 Picoeukaryote
 Biliphyta

References

External links 
 
 
 Neue Algengruppe entdeckt: Picobiliphyta 
 New Group Of Algae Discovered: Picobiliphytes 
 Tree of Life: Biliphytes

Hacrobia
Bikont phyla
Articles containing video clips